Grapefruit is a type of citrus fruit.

Grapefruit may also refer to:
 Grapefruit (band), a 1960s pop band
 Grapefruit (Maaya Sakamoto album), 1997
 Grapefruit (Kiran Leonard album), 2016
 Grapefruit (book), a 1964 book by Yoko Ono
 Grapefruit (music label), an American record label based in Brooklyn, USA

See also 
 Grapefruit diet, a type of diet
 Grapefruit knife, a knife designed for cutting grapefruit
 Grapefruit spoon, a spoon with teeth at its edge
 Grape, an unrelated type of fruit